The Folly of Vanity is a 1924 American silent drama film codirected by Maurice Elvey and Henry Otto and starring Billie Dove and Betty Blythe. It was produced and distributed by the Fox Film Corporation. The film is divided into two sections, the modern part which was directed by Elvey and the underwater fantasy section directed by Otto.

Plot
As described in a review in a film magazine, Alice (Dove), a beautiful young wife, loves jewelry and spends some money intended for other purposes to buy an imitation pearl necklace. Her husband Robert (Muhall) invites Ridgeway (St. Polis), a wealthy client, to dinner. Ridgeway is a conisseur of women and pearls and invites the young couple to a party he is giving. Robert chides Alice for buying the pearls and declines the invitation but Allice, determined to go, gets her way. Ridgeway presents his guests with expensive jewelry as souvenirs and, unable to persuades Alice to take any, insists that she wear a beautiful pearl necklace to restore the lustre of her imitation pearls. The whole crowd is invited on a yacht cruise where Ridgeway is attentive to Alice, while a wealthy widow (Blythe) attracts Robert. Alice and Robert have a quarrel. That night Alice dreams that Ridgeway is attempting to attack her. She jumps into the sea and is carried to Neptune's court where all wonders and beauties are shown her. Neptune (Klein) is depicted as surrounded by beautiful maidens who are scatily clad or unclad. A festival is held in Alice's honor. A witch (Drovnar) discovers that an imprint has been on her neck by the pearl necklace, a mark of vanity, and Neptune orders her cast out. Awakening, she returns the necklace to Ridgeway and by error enters Roberts room, where a reconciliation occurs.

Cast

Production
Portions of the dream fantasy sequence were tinted in various shades, some to indicate being underwater.

Preservation
A print of The Folly of Vanity reportedly is held in the Národní filmový archiv and in an American collection.

References

External links

Still at silentfilmstillarchive.com

1924 films
American silent feature films
Fox Film films
Films directed by Henry Otto
Films directed by Maurice Elvey
1924 drama films
American black-and-white films
Silent American drama films
1920s English-language films
1920s American films